Davorin Kablar (born 6 December 1977) is a Slovenian football player, who plays for FC Pasching.

Career
The defender has played for LASK Linz, SV Ried, Cerezo Osaka, IFK Mariehamn, Hrvatski Dragovoljac and NK Inter Zaprešić.

Honours
Pasching
Austrian Cup: 2012–13

References

External links

1977 births
Living people
Slovenian footballers
Slovenian expatriate footballers
NK Hrvatski Dragovoljac players
NK Inter Zaprešić players
NK Croatia Sesvete players
SV Ried players
Cerezo Osaka players
LASK players
FC Juniors OÖ players
J1 League players
Expatriate footballers in Japan
Expatriate footballers in Austria
People from Brežice
Association football defenders